During the 1930s the United States was facing its longest and deepest economic downturn, the Great Depression. Spending money on entertainment was out of the question for most people. The United States put the nation back to work, including artists and entertainers in its assistance programs.

Movies
Many films still highly cherished today were created during the 1920s. During that period, Walt Disney, the pioneer animator, produced films Americans loved to see. One of his best-known animations was the tale of the Three Little Pigs, originally produced in 1933. This is another of his that became a part of American culture. Half a century later, his productions are still famous and frequently viewed by children and adults. Many classic films were created during this time, including, Frankenstein, 42nd Street, King Kong, Snow White and the Seven Dwarfs, The Wizard of Oz, Mr. Smith Goes to Washington and Gone With the Wind

Comedies were popular films in the 1930s. A good laugh eased the mind and brought joy in a time of adversity. Towards the late 1930s, films that showed how America was fighting against the Great Depression became popular as well.

Radio
Listening to radio broadcasting became a source of nearly free entertainment. The radio stations had a little bit of everything for all ages, young and old. One of the most common radio shows for young children was Little Orphan Annie. The show is about an adventurous young girl who had an equally adventurous dog named Sandy. Together, Annie and Sandy would try to solve mysteries. The show was so loved by children that they soon began to purchase small items of merchandise such as pins of Annie. Later, an actual film was released to the public. Adults listened to newscasts, radio theater, the Grand Ole Opry, soap operas, and sermons as well.

Board games
The board game Monopoly, published by the Parker brother in 1935, was a popular favorite. It cost $1 (one U.S dollar) during the time. With calculation of inflation, that would be $15.45 in 2020. Another popular game was Sorry!, which was adopted by the Parker brothers in 1934.

References

Great Depression
Great Depression
Cultural history of the United States